Mozaffari (also Romanized as Moz̧affarī; also known as Muz̧affarī) is a village in Efzar Rural District, Efzar District, Qir and Karzin County, Fars Province, Iran. At the 2006 census, its population was 1,333, in 303 families.

References 

Populated places in Qir and Karzin County